KHTY (970 AM) is a commercial radio station that is licensed to Bakersfield, California and serves inland central California. The station is owned by iHeartMedia and airs a sports radio format as an affiliate of Fox Sports Radio. The KHTY studios are located in southwest Bakersfield, and its transmitter is located east of Oildale.

KHTY broadcasts various sports programs, including Los Angeles Lakers and Los Angeles Dodgers games as well as NASCAR races.

History
The station on 970 AM first signed on in March 1961 as KBIS, a daytimer operating at a power of 1,000 watts.

In June 1976, Westco Media sold KBIS to Thunderbird Broadcasting, owned by country music singer Buck Owens, for $382,500. As Thunderbird already owned KUZZ (then at 800 AM) in Bakersfield, and Federal Communications Commission (FCC) regulations at the time prohibited ownership of multiple AM stations within the same market, that company sold KUZZ to the International Church of the Foursquare Gospel for $100,000. The FCC approved both license transfers on November 16, and KBIS adopted the KUZZ call letters the following January.

In August 1984, Buck Owens Broadcasting orchestrated a frequency swap with Sunset Broadcasting Corp., owner of KAFY. Owens traded KUZZ, a daytimer on 970 AM, to Sunset for KAFY — located on the stronger, full-time 550 AM frequency — plus $650,000 in cash. The 970 AM frequency took on the KAFY call letters in January 1986. In April 1987, Sunset Broadcasting, headed by Daren McGavren, sold KAFY to McGavren-Barro Broadcasting Corp. — owned by  his son Steve McGavren and Mary Helen Barro — for $700,000. At the time of the sale, KAFY was broadcasting in the Spanish language.

In April 2000, Hispanic Media Group, headed by Amancio Suarez Sr., sold KAFY and a construction permit for a second AM station in Bakersfield to Golden Pegasus Financial Services for $825,000. At the time, KAFY broadcast a regional Mexican music format. The station would change hands once again by the end of the year as Clear Channel Communications purchased the newly rechristened KZPM for $1.4 million.

Throughout the 2000s under Clear Channel ownership, the 970 AM frequency took on various call signs and formats. In May 2001, Clear Channel began using the KZTK call sign on the then-news/talk outlet. In September 2002, the call letters changed to KGET to match those of television station KGET-TV, at the time also owned by Clear Channel. The radio station KGET was branded "News Talk 970 KGET".

In January 2006, the KGET call letters were changed to KHTY. The station at the time was a classic hits radio station branded as "Mighty 970". In 2007, KHTY switched back to news/talk with the branding "Business 970 KHTY". Later that year, KHTY began airing a news/talk format in Spanish.

On March 2, 2009, KHTY flipped to sports radio with the branding "Fox Sports 970".

On June 13, 2022, KHTY began simulcasting on KBFP 800 AM Bakersfield, replacing that station's comedy format.

Programming
The station lineup includes The Dan Patrick Show, The Rich Eisen Show, The Doug Gottlieb Show, Steve Gorman Sports, The Odd Couple, Jason Smith, Ben Maller, and other Fox Sports Radio programs. Also on KHTY are broadcasts of the Bakersfield Condors and the Los Angeles Dodgers.

References

External links
FCC History Cards for KHTY

 - Heard exclusively on Fox Sports 970

HTY
Radio stations established in 1958
IHeartMedia radio stations
1958 establishments in California